For the main article see Bavarian ice hockey leagues

The 2008-2009 Bavarian ice hockey season started on 17 October 2008 with the first round in the Bayernliga and finished on 22 March 2009 with the second Bayernliga final, with the ERV Schweinfurt taking out the title for a third time, having previously won it in 1990 and 2000.

Two clubs finished the season with only one loss to their name, the Bezirksliga and Landesliga champions TSV Schliersee and EHC Bayreuth, while the TSV Trostberg II was the only team not to record a win, having now not won a league game since January 2006.

Champions
The three levels of the Bavarian league system were won by the following teams:

 Bayernliga: ERV Schweinfurt
 Landesliga: EHC Bayreuth
 Bezirksliga: TSV Schliersee

Bayernliga
 The competition will be played, as in the years previously, with 16 teams, with the top eight qualified for the championship play-off and the bottom eight having to play-down to determine the two relegated teams. Differently from the previous season, the league did not enter the play-offs straight after the main round. Instead it played another group phase in four groups of four teams.

Main round: Final table

 Abbreviations: P = Games played, OTW = Overtime win, OTL = Overtime loss, GF = Goals for, GA = Goals against, GD = Goal difference, (N) = Promoted club

Group phase: Final table

Championship round
The eight teams qualified for this round were split into two groups; Group A consisted of the teams having finished 1st, 4th, 5th and 8th in the main round. Group B consisted of the 2nd, 3rd, 6th and 7th team. The top two teams of each group qualified for the play-off semi-finals.
 Group A

 Group B

Relegation round
The eight teams qualified for this round were also split into two groups. Group A consisted of the teams having finished 9th, 12th, 13th and 16th in the main round. Group B consisted of the 10th, 11th, 14th and 15th team. The bottom two teams of each group had to enter the play-downs while the top two teams were qualified for next seasons Bayernliga.
 Group A

 Group B

Play-Offs
The semi-finals and the final are played in a best-of-three modus.

Semi finals

Finals
 Championship:

 The ERV Schweinfurt is the 2008-09 Bayernliga champions.

Play-Downs

Semi finals

Final

Landesliga
The four regional divisions played out a home-and-away round to determine the four clubs from each league who enter the sixteen team promotion round. Split into two groups of eight, the top team of each division gains promotion to the Bayernliga. Should one or more teams from this league move up to the Oberliga without a Bavarian team being relegated from there, additional clubs from that round may gain promotion.

The remaining sixteen clubs played out a relegation round with the last two team in each of the two groups being relegated to the Bezirksliga.

First round
Top four teams enter the promotion round.
 Landesliga Nord

 The EV Regensburg was forced to resign from the 2nd Bundesliga due to insolvency.
 The 1. EV Weiden voluntarily withdrew from the Oberliga to the Landesliga
 Landesliga Süd

 Landesliga Ost

 Landesliga West

 (R) denotes team relegated from the Bayernliga after previous season.
 (N) denotes team promoted from the Bezirksliga after previous season.

Promotion round
Top team in each division promoted to the Bayernliga. The second placed teams may have a promotion chance if a Bavarian team is promoted from the Bayernliga to the Oberliga.
 Group A

 Group B

Finals
The two division winners will play a two match series to determine the Landesliga champions while the two division runners-up will play for third place, which could also determine who will be pro moted if a third team was to move up to the Bayernliga.
 Third place

 Championship

Relegation round
The two bottom teams in each division are relegated to the Bezirksliga.
 Group North/East

 Group South/West

Bezirksliga
The four regional division played out a home-and-away round to determined the league winner. The four league champions are promoted to the Landesliga and also are qualified for the Bezirksliga championship round.

Main round
First placed team enters championship round and is promoted to Landesliga. 
 Bezirksliga Nord

 Bezirksliga Süd

 Bezirksliga Ost

 Bezirksliga West

Championship round
The Bezirksliga championship was decided in a home-and-away round with the club with the best aggregate score taking out the series. All four teams are already promoted to the Landesliga.

Semi finals

Finals
 Third place:

 Championship:

 The TSV Schliersee is the 2008-09 Bavarian Bezirksliga champion.

Sources
 Bayrischer Eissport Verband- Official Bavarian ice hockey website
 Hockey Archives - International ice hockey website with tables and results (in French)
 Bayernhockey-Inoffical website on Bavarian ice hockey

2008
2008–09 in German ice hockey